Disney is the common short name/spoken name for The Walt Disney Company, an American diversified multinational mass media and entertainment conglomerate.

Disney may also refer to:

Units of The Walt Disney Company
Disney Enterprises, Inc., the copyright holder and trademark owner of everything Disney-branded
Walt Disney Studios (Burbank), the company headquarters and studio lot in Burbank, California
Walt Disney Studios (division), the film studios division of The Walt Disney Company
Walt Disney Studios Motion Pictures, the theatrical distribution division of The Walt Disney Company
Walt Disney Pictures, the film distribution banner and production company of The Walt Disney Company
Walt Disney Animation Studios, the main animation studio (formerly known as Walt Disney Feature Animation)
Walt Disney Studios Home Entertainment, the home entertainment distribution division of The Walt Disney Company
Disney Theatrical Group, the live show, stageplay and musical production arm of The Walt Disney Company
Disney Theatrical Productions, the flagship stageplay and musical production division of The Walt Disney Company
Disney Music Group, the music publishing arm of The Walt Disney Company
Walt Disney Records, the flagship Disney-branded music label
Disney Parks, Experiences and Products, the division which builds and manages Disney's theme parks and vacation resorts, Disney Stores, merchandising, publishing and digital media, games and interactive experiences
Walt Disney World
Disneyland Resort
Disneyland
Disney California Adventure
Disneyland Paris
Hong Kong Disneyland Resort
Tokyo Disney Resort
Shanghai Disney Resort
Disney Signature Experiences, non-theme park travel units
Adventures by Disney
Disney Cruise Line
Disney's Castaway Cay
Disney Vacation Club
Walt Disney Imagineering, the research and development arm of The Walt Disney Company responsible for the creation, design and construction of global Disney theme parks and attractions
Disney Publishing Worldwide, the publishing division of The Walt Disney Company
Disney Programs, division that provides paid internship experiences in The Walt Disney Company to college students and graduates
Disney College Program
Disney International Programs
Disney Media Networks, the former division before the October 10, 2020 breakup and restructuring into Disney Media and Entertainment Distribution, Disney General Entertainment Content and ESPN and Sports Content
Walt Disney Television — rebranded as "Disney General Entertainment Content" or "Disney General Entertainment" in 2021
Disney Channel, a pay television network owned by The Walt Disney Company
Walt Disney Television, a broken-up and defunct American television production company arm of The Walt Disney Company active from 1983 to 2003
Disney Television Animation, the television animation studio division of The Walt Disney Company
Capital Disney, a defunct digital radio station in the United Kingdom owned by The Walt Disney Company which was active from 2002 until 2007
Radio Disney, a defunct radio network in the United States owned by The Walt Disney Company which was active from 1996 until 2021
Disney+, a streaming service launched on November 12, 2019 and is owned and operated by The Walt Disney Company

People with the surname

Walt Disney and relatives
Walt Disney (1901–1966), founder of The Walt Disney Company
Roy O. Disney (1893–1971), Walt's brother and co-founder of The Walt Disney Company
Roy E. Disney (1930–2009), son of Roy O. and leader of the Save Disney campaign
Abigail Disney (born 1960), Walt's grandniece, philanthropist and film-maker
Lillian Disney (1899–1997), Walt's wife
Elias Disney (1859–1941), father of Walt and Roy O.
Herbert Arthur Disney (1888–1961), brother of Walt and Roy O.
Diane Marie Disney (1933–2013), Walt's daughter
Sharon Mae Disney (1936–1993), Walt's adopted daughter

Others
Donald Disney, Fellow of the Institute of Electrical and Electronics Engineers
Doris Miles Disney (1907-1976), American author
Dorothy Cameron Disney (1903-1992), American author
John Disney (antiquarian) (1779–1857), English barrister and archaeologist
John Disney (ornithologist) (1919–2014), Australian ornithologist
John Disney (priest) (1677–1730), English clergyman
John Disney (Unitarian) (1746–1816), English Unitarian minister and biographical writer
Melissa Disney, American voice actress
Moore Disney (1766-1846), British Army officer
Richard Disney (disambiguation)
Wesley E. Disney, former US congressman from Oklahoma
Disney-Roebuck family, see Captain Disney-Roebuck

Other uses
Disney, Oklahoma, United States
Disney bomb, a British "rocket-assisted" bomb of World War II

See also
Disney Enterprises (disambiguation)
Disney family, a surname
Disneyland (disambiguation)
Walt Disney (disambiguation)
Disney Rodríguez, a Cuban freestyle wrestler
Dizney, Kentucky, U.S.
Norton Disney, Lincolnshire, U.K.